Admiral Affleck may refer to:

Edmund Affleck (1725–1788), British Royal Navy rear admiral
Philip Affleck (c. 1726–1799), British Royal Navy rear admiral